Gamsiella is a fungal genus in the Mortierellaceae family of the Zygomycota. The genus is monotypic, containing the single species Gamsiella multidivaricata, found in the United States.

The genus name of Gamsiella is in honour of Konrad Walter Gams (1934 - 2017), who was an Austrian botanist and scientist.

The genus was circumscribed by Gerald Leonard Benny and Meredith Blackwell in Mycologia Vol.96 (Issue 1) on page 147 in 2004.

References

External links

Fungi of North America
Zygomycota genera